The 1909 VMI Keydets football team represented the Virginia Military Institute (VMI) in their 19th season of organized football. First-year coach William Gloth lead VMI to a 4–3 season.

Schedule

References

VMI
VMI Keydets football seasons
VMI Keydets football